Kalolo Toleafoa (born 26 May 1971 in Apia) is a Samoan rugby union player. He plays as a flanker.

Career
He started his rugby career with the Marist St. Joseph.
His first international match was against Tonga, at Sydney, on 18 September 1998. He was also part of the 1999 Rugby World Cup roster, playing only the match against Argentina, at Llanelli.
He also was part of the 1997 Rugby World Cup Sevens roster.

Notes

External links

Kalolo Toleafoa at New Zealand Rugby History

1971 births
Living people
Sportspeople from Apia
Samoan rugby union players
Samoan expatriates in New Zealand
Rugby union flankers
Samoa international rugby union players
Male rugby sevens players
Samoa international rugby sevens players